Jean-Michel Roux (born 8 May 1964 in Nancy, France) is an autodidactic script-writer and film-maker.

Biography 
Jean-Michel Roux began his career with films in the fantasy genre and also science fiction films. Passionate about the mysteries of life and the invisible world, he went on to direct documentary films in Northern European countries.

The Thousand Wonders of the Universe has received Jury prizes at The Swedish Fantastic Film Festival in Malmo and at the Fantafestival in Rome and Investigation into the Invisible World has been selected at the Sundance Film Festival for best documentary.

Angel of the North, a documentary on the human soul, angels and the beyond, was released in theatres in Finland. It was nominated for the best feature documentary category at the Jussi Awards 2018 (the Finnish Oscars).

Filmography 

 1984: Wild District (Quartier sauvage) – short film
 1987: The Voice of the Desert (La voix du désert) – short film
 1992: Too Near the Gods (Trop près des dieux) – short film
 1997:  (Les Mille Merveilles de l'univers) – feature film
 1997: Elfland – documentary
 2002: Investigation into the Invisible World (Enquête sur le monde invisible) – documentary
 2009: The Mysteries of Snæffellsjökull (Les Mysteres du snæffellsjökull) – documentary
 2009: The Heart of the Earth (Le Cœur de la terre) – short film
 2017: Angel of the North (L'Ange du Nord) – documentary film

References

External links 
 Jean-Michel Roux on IMDb.

Living people
French filmmakers
1964 births
Mass media people from Nancy, France